Allen Burroughs Hannay (February 14, 1892 – October 22, 1983) was a United States district judge of the United States District Court for the Southern District of Texas.

Education and career
Born in Hempstead, Texas, Hannay received a Bachelor of Laws from the University of Texas School of Law in 1913. He was in private practice in Hempstead and Houston, Texas from 1913 to 1930. He was a Judge in Waller County, Texas from 1915 to 1917. He was a state district judge in the 113th Judicial District of Texas from 1930 to 1942.

Federal judicial service
On July 16, 1942, Hannay was nominated by President Franklin D. Roosevelt to a seat on the United States District Court for the Southern District of Texas vacated by Judge James V. Allred. Hannay was confirmed by the United States Senate on August 6, 1942, and received his commission on August 12, 1942. He served as Chief Judge from 1954 to 1962. He assumed senior status on August 6, 1975, serving in that capacity until his death on October 22, 1983, in Houston.

References

Sources
 

1892 births
1983 deaths
Texas state court judges
Judges of the United States District Court for the Southern District of Texas
United States district court judges appointed by Franklin D. Roosevelt
20th-century American judges
University of Texas School of Law alumni